Pedro Rodríguez (born 12 February 1950) is a former Cuban cyclist. He competed in the individual road race and team time trial events at the 1972 Summer Olympics. as well as the men's time trial at the 1971 Pan American Games. 

At the 1971 Pan American Games in Cali, Colombia, he won a gold medal for the Men's Team Time Trial event alongside Gregorio Aldo Arencibia, Roberto Menéndez, and Galio Albolo.

References

External links
 

1950 births
Living people
Cuban male cyclists
Olympic cyclists of Cuba
Cyclists at the 1972 Summer Olympics
Place of birth missing (living people)
Pan American Games medalists in cycling
Pan American Games gold medalists for Cuba
Cyclists at the 1971 Pan American Games
20th-century Cuban people
21st-century Cuban people